Diego Álvarez may refer to:
 a mistaken name in some 19th-century English sources for Gough Island
 Diego Álvarez Chanca, doctor who accompanied Christopher Columbus
 Diego Álvarez Benítez (1812–1899), Mexican general
 Diego Álvarez (footballer) (born 1981), Colombian footballer
 Diego Álvarez (tennis) (born 1980), Argentine tennis player
 Diego Álvarez (theologian) (c. 1558–1635), Spanish theologian and bishop of Trani
 Diego Betancur Álvarez (born 1958), Colombian ambassador to Australia and New Zealand
 Diego Alvarez (Chander Pahar), a fictional character in the novel Chander Pahar

See also
 Caramuru (Diogo Álvares Correia, c. 1475–1557), Portuguese adventurer
 José Diego Álvarez (disambiguation)